Terence Chi-Shen Tao  (born 17 July 1975) is an Australian-born mathematician. He is a professor of mathematics at the University of California, Los Angeles (UCLA), where he holds the James and Carol Collins chair. His research includes topics in harmonic analysis, partial differential equations, algebraic combinatorics, arithmetic combinatorics, geometric combinatorics, probability theory, compressed sensing and analytic number theory.

Tao was born to ethnic Chinese immigrant parents and raised in Adelaide. Tao won the Fields Medal in 2006 and won the Royal Medal and Breakthrough Prize in Mathematics in 2014. He is also a 2006 MacArthur Fellow. Tao has been the author or co-author of over three hundred research papers. He is widely regarded as one of the greatest living mathematicians and has been referred to as the "Mozart of mathematics".

Life and career

Family
Tao's  parents are first-generation immigrants from Hong Kong to Australia. Tao's father, Billy Tao, was a Chinese paediatrician who was born in Shanghai and earned his medical degree (MBBS) from the University of Hong Kong in 1969. Tao's mother, Grace Leong, was born in Hong Kong; she received a first-class honours degree in astrophysics and mathematics at the University of Hong Kong. She was a secondary school teacher of mathematics and physics in Hong Kong. Billy and Grace met as students at the University of Hong Kong. They then emigrated from Hong Kong to Australia in 1972.

Tao also has two brothers (Trevor and Nigel), who are living in Australia. Both formerly represented the country at the International Mathematical Olympiad. Tao speaks Cantonese but cannot write Chinese. Tao is married to Laura Tao, a Chinese-American woman who is an electrical engineer at NASA's Jet Propulsion Laboratory. They live with their son and daughter (William and Madeleine) in Los Angeles, California.

Childhood
A child prodigy, Tao exhibited extraordinary mathematical abilities from an early age, attending university-level mathematics courses at the age of 9. He is one of only three children in the history of the Johns Hopkins' Study of Exceptional Talent program to have achieved a score of 700 or greater on the SAT math section while just eight years old; Tao scored a 760. Julian Stanley, Director of the Study of Mathematically Precocious Youth, stated that Tao had the greatest mathematical reasoning ability he had found in years of intensive searching. 

Tao was the youngest participant to date in the International Mathematical Olympiad, first competing at the age of ten; in 1986, 1987, and 1988, he won a bronze, silver, and gold medal, respectively. Tao remains the youngest winner of each of the three medals in the Olympiad's history, having won the gold medal at the age of 13 in 1988.

Career

At age 14, Tao attended the Research Science Institute, a summer program for secondary students. In 1991, he received his bachelor's and master's degrees at the age of 16 from Flinders University under the direction of Garth Gaudry. In 1992, he won a postgraduate Fulbright Scholarship to undertake research in mathematics at Princeton University in the United States. From 1992 to 1996, Tao was a graduate student at Princeton University under the direction of Elias Stein, receiving his PhD at the age of 21. In 1996, he joined the faculty of the University of California, Los Angeles. In 1999, when he was 24, he was promoted to full professor at UCLA and remains the youngest person ever appointed to that rank by the institution.

He is known for his collaborative mindset; by 2006, Tao had worked with over 30 others in his discoveries, reaching 68 co-authors by October 2015.

Tao has had a particularly extensive collaboration with British mathematician Ben J. Green; together they proved the Green–Tao theorem, which is well-known among both amateur and professional mathematicians. This theorem states that there are arbitrarily long arithmetic progressions of prime numbers. The New York Times described it this way:

Many other results of Tao have received mainstream attention in the scientific press, including:
 his establishment of finite time blowup for a modification of the famous Navier–Stokes existence and smoothness Millennium Problem
 his 2015 resolution of the Erdős discrepancy problem, which used entropy estimates within analytic number theory
 his 2019 progress on the Collatz conjecture, in which he proved the probabilistic claim that almost all Collatz orbits attain almost bounded values.
Tao has also resolved or made progress on a number of conjectures. In 2012, Green and Tao announced proofs of the conjectured "orchard-planting problem," which asks for the maximum number of lines through exactly 3 points in a set of n points in the plane, not all on a line. In 2018, with Brad Rodgers, Tao showed that the de Bruijn–Newman constant, the nonpositivity of which is equivalent to the Riemann hypothesis, is nonnegative. In 2020, Tao proved Sendov's conjecture, concerning the locations of the roots and critical points of a complex polynomial, in the special case of polynomials with sufficiently high degree.

Recognition

British mathematician and Fields medalist Timothy Gowers remarked on Tao's breadth of knowledge:

An article by New Scientist writes of his ability:

Tao has won numerous mathematician honours and awards over the years. He is a Fellow of the Royal Society, the Australian Academy of Science (Corresponding Member), the National Academy of Sciences (Foreign member), the American Academy of Arts and Sciences, the American Philosophical Society, and the American Mathematical Society. In 2006 he received the Fields Medal; he was the first Australian, the first UCLA faculty member, and one of the youngest mathematicians to receive the award. He was also awarded the MacArthur Fellowship. He has been featured in The New York Times, CNN, USA Today, Popular Science, and many other media outlets. In 2014, Tao received a CTY Distinguished Alumni Honor from Johns Hopkins Center for Gifted and Talented Youth in front of 979 attendees in 8th and 9th grade that are in the same program from which Tao graduated. In 2021, President Joe Biden announced Tao had been selected as one of 30 members of his President's Council of Advisors on Science and Technology, a body bringing together America's most distinguished leaders in science and technology. In 2021, Tao was awarded the Riemann Prize Week as recipient of the inaugural Riemann Prize 2019 by the Riemann International School of Mathematics at the University of Insubria. Tao was a finalist to become Australian of the Year in 2007.

As of 2022, Tao has published over three hundred articles, along with sixteen books. He has an Erdős number of 2. He is a highly cited researcher.

Research contributions

Dispersive partial differential equations
From 2001 to 2010, Tao was part of a well-known collaboration with James Colliander, Markus Keel, Gigliola Staffilani, and Hideo Takaoka. They found a number of novel results, many to do with the well-posedness of weak solutions, for Schrödinger equations, KdV equations, and KdV-type equations.

Michael Christ, Colliander, and Tao developed methods of Carlos Kenig, Gustavo Ponce, and Luis Vega to establish ill-posedness of certain Schrödinger and KdV equations for Sobolev data of sufficiently low exponents. In many cases these results were sharp enough to perfectly complement well-posedness results for sufficiently large exponents as due to Bourgain, Colliander−Keel−Staffilani−Takaoka−Tao, and others. Further such notable results for Schrödinger equations were found by Tao in collaboration with Ioan Bejenaru.

A particularly notable result of the Colliander−Keel−Staffilani−Takaoka−Tao collaboration established the long-time existence and scattering theory of a power-law Schrödinger equation in three dimensions. Their methods, which made use of the scale-invariance of the simple power law, were extended by Tao in collaboration with Monica Vișan and Xiaoyi Zhang to deal with nonlinearities in which the scale-invariance is broken. Rowan Killip, Tao, and Vișan later made notable progress on the two-dimensional problem in radial symmetry.

A technical tour de force by Tao in 2001 considered the wave maps equation with two-dimensional domain and spherical range. He built upon earlier innovations of Daniel Tataru, who considered wave maps valued in Minkowski space. Tao proved the global well-posedness of solutions with sufficiently small initial data. The fundamental difficulty is that Tao considers smallness relative to the critical Sobolev norm, which typically requires sophisticated techniques. Tao later adapted some of his work on wave maps to the setting of the Benjamin–Ono equation; Alexandru Ionescu and Kenig later obtained improved results with Tao's methods.

In 2016, Tao constructed a variant of the Navier–Stokes equations which possess solutions exhibiting irregular behavior in finite time. Due to structural similarities between Tao's system and the Navier–Stokes equations themselves, it follows that any positive resolution of the Navier–Stokes existence and smoothness problem must take into account the specific nonlinear structure of the equations. In particular, certain previously-proposed resolutions of the problem could not be legitimate. Tao speculated that the Navier–Stokes equations might be able to simulate a Turing complete system, and that as a consequence it might be possible to (negatively) resolve the existence and smoothness problem using a modification of his results. However, such results remain (as of 2022) conjectural.

Harmonic analysis
Bent Fuglede introduced the Fuglede conjecture in the 1970s, positing a tile-based characterisation of those Euclidean domains for which a Fourier ensemble provides a basis of  Tao resolved the conjecture in the negative for dimensions larger than 5, based upon the construction of an elementary counterexample to an analogous problem in the setting of finite groups.

With Camil Muscalu and Christoph Thiele, Tao considered certain multilinear singular integral operators with the multiplier allowed to degenerate on a hyperplane, identifying conditions which ensure operator continuity relative to  spaces. This unified and extended earlier notable results of Ronald Coifman, Carlos Kenig, Michael Lacey, Yves Meyer, Elias Stein, and Thiele, among others. Similar problems were analyzed by Tao in 2001 in the context of Bourgain spaces, rather than the usual  spaces. Such estimates are used in establishing well-posedness results for dispersive partial differential equations, following famous earlier work of Jean Bourgain, Kenig, Gustavo Ponce, and Luis Vega, among others.

A number of Tao's results deal with "restriction" phenomena in Fourier analysis, which have been widely studied since seminal articles of Charles Fefferman, Robert Strichartz, and Peter Tomas in the 1970s. Here one studies the operation which restricts input functions on Euclidean space to a submanifold and outputs the product of the Fourier transforms of the corresponding measures. It is of major interest to identify exponents such that this operation is continuous relative to  spaces. Such multilinear problems originated in the 1990s, including in notable work of Jean Bourgain, Sergiu Klainerman, and Matei Machedon. In collaboration with Ana Vargas and Luis Vega, Tao made some foundational contributions to the study of the bilinear restriction problem, establishing new exponents and drawing connections to the linear restriction problem. They also found analogous results for the bilinear Kakeya problem which is based upon the X-ray transform instead of the Fourier transform. In 2003, Tao adapted ideas developed by Thomas Wolff for bilinear restriction to conical sets into the setting of restriction to quadratic hypersurfaces. The multilinear setting for these problems was further developed by Tao in collaboration with Jonathan Bennett and Anthony Carbery; their work was extensively used by Bourgain and Larry Guth in deriving estimates for general oscillatory integral operators.

Compressed sensing and statistics
In collaboration with Emmanuel Candes and Justin Romberg, Tao has made notable contributions to the field of compressed sensing. In mathematical terms, most of their results identify settings in which a convex optimisation problem correctly computes the solution of an optimisation problem which seems to lack a computationally tractable structure. These problems are of the nature of finding the solution of an underdetermined linear system with the minimal possible number of nonzero entries, referred to as "sparsity". Around the same time, David Donoho considered similar problems from the alternative perspective of high-dimensional geometry.

Motivated by striking numerical experiments, Candes, Romberg, and Tao first studied the case where the matrix is given by the discrete Fourier transform. Candes and Tao abstracted the problem and introduced the notion of a "restricted linear isometry," which is a matrix that is quantitatively close to an isometry when restricted to certain subspaces. They showed that it is sufficient for either exact or optimally approximate recovery of sufficiently sparse solutions. Their proofs, which involved the theory of convex duality, were markedly simplified in collaboration with Romberg, to use only linear algebra and elementary ideas of harmonic analysis. These ideas and results were later improved by Candes. Candes and Tao also considered relaxations of the sparsity condition, such as power-law decay of coefficients. They complemented these results by drawing on a large corpus of past results in random matrix theory to show that, according to the Gaussian ensemble, a large number of matrices satisfy the restricted isometry property.

In 2009, Candes and Benjamin Recht considered an analogous problem for recovering a matrix from knowledge of only a few of its entries and the information that the matrix is of low rank. They formulated the problem in terms of convex optimisation, studying minimisation of the nuclear norm. Candes and Tao, in 2010, developed further results and techniques for the same problem. Improved results were later found by Recht. Similar problems and results have also been considered by a number of other authors.

In 2007, Candes and Tao introduced a novel statistical estimator for linear regression, which they called the "Dantzig selector." They proved a number of results on its success as an estimator and model selector, roughly in parallel to their earlier work on compressed sensing. A number of other authors have since studied the Dantzig selector, comparing it to similar objects such as the statistical lasso introduced in the 1990s. Trevor Hastie, Robert Tibshirani, and Jerome H. Friedman conclude that it is "somewhat unsatisfactory" in a number of cases. Nonetheless it remains of significant interest in the statistical literature.

Random matrices
In the 1950s, Eugene Wigner initiated the study of random matrices and their eigenvalues. Wigner studied the case of hermitian and symmetric matrices, proving a "semicircle law" for their eigenvalues. In 2010, Tao and Van Vu made a major contribution to the study of non-symmetric random matrices. They showed that if  is large and the entries of a  matrix  are selected randomly according to any fixed probability distribution of average 0 and standard deviation 1, then the eigenvalues of  will tend to be uniformly scattered across the disk of radius  around the origin; this can be made precise using the language of measure theory. This gave a proof of the long-conjectured circular law, which had previously been proved in weaker formulations by many other authors. In Tao and Vu's formulation, the circular law becomes an immediate consequence of a "universality principle" stating that the distribution of the eigenvalues can depend only on the average and standard deviation of the given component-by-component probability distribution, thereby providing a reduction of the general circular law to a calculation for specially-chosen probability distributions.

In 2011, Tao and Vu established a "four moment theorem", which applies to random hermitian matrices whose components are independently distributed, each with average 0 and standard deviation 1, and which are exponentially unlikely to be large (as for a Gaussian distribution). If one considers two such random matrices which agree on the average value of any quadratic polynomial in the diagonal entries and on the average value of any quartic polynomial in the off-diagonal entries, then Tao and Vu show that the expected value of a large number of functions of the eigenvalues will also coincide, up to an error which is uniformly controllable by the size of the matrix and which becomes arbitrarily small as the size of the matrix increases. Similar results were obtained around the same time by László Erdös, Horng-Tzer Yau, and Jun Yin.

Analytic number theory and arithmetic combinatorics
In 2004, Tao, together with Jean Bourgain and Nets Katz, studied the additive and multiplicative structure of subsets of finite fields of prime order. It is well known that there are no nontrivial subrings of such a field. Bourgain, Katz, and Tao provided a quantitative formulation of this fact, showing that for any subset of such a field, the number of sums and products of elements of the subset must be quantitatively large, as compared to the size of the field and the size of the subset itself. Improvements of their result were later given by Bourgain, Alexey Glibichuk, and Sergei Konyagin.

Tao and Ben Green proved the existence of arbitrarily long arithmetic progressions in the prime numbers; this result is generally referred to as the Green–Tao theorem, and is among Tao's most well-known results. The source of Green and Tao's arithmetic progressions is Endre Szemerédi's seminal 1975 theorem on existence of arithmetic progressions in certain sets of integers. Green and Tao showed that one can use a "transference principle" to extend the validity of Szemerédi's theorem to further sets of integers. The Green–Tao theorem then arises as a special case, although it is not trivial to show that the prime numbers satisfy the conditions of Green and Tao's extension of the Szemerédi theorem.

In 2010, Green and Tao gave a multilinear extension of Dirichlet's celebrated theorem on arithmetic progressions. The proof of Green and Tao was incomplete, as it was conditioned upon unproven conjectures. Those conjectures were proved in later work of Green, Tao, and Tamar Ziegler.

Notable awards

 1999 – Packard Fellowship
 2000 – Salem Prize for:
"his work in  harmonic analysis and on related questions in geometric measure theory and partial differential equations."
 2002 – Bôcher Memorial Prize for:
Global regularity of wave maps I. Small critical Sobolev norm in high dimensions. Internat. Math. Res. Notices (2001), no. 6, 299-328.
Global regularity of wave maps II. Small energy in two dimensions. Comm. Math. Phys. 2244 (2001), no. 2, 443-544.
in addition to "his remarkable series of papers, written in collaboration with J. Colliander, M. Keel, G. Staffilani, and H. Takaoka, on global regularity in optimal Sobolev spaces for KdV and other equations, as well as his many deep contributions to Strichartz and bilinear estimates."
 2003 – Clay Research Award for:
his restriction theorems in Fourier analysis, his work on wave maps, his global existence theorems for KdV-type equations, and for his solution with Allen Knutson of Horn's conjecture
 2005 – Australian Mathematical Society Medal
 2005 – Ostrowski Prize (with Ben Green) for:
"their exceptional achievements in the area of analytic and combinatorial number theory"
 2005 – Levi L.Conant Prize (with Allen Knutson) for:
their expository article "Honeycombs and Sums of Hermitian Matrices" (Notices of the AMS. 48 (2001), 175–186.)
 2006 – Fields Medal for:
"his contributions to partial differential equations, combinatorics, harmonic analysis and additive number theory"
 2006 – MacArthur Award
 2006 – SASTRA Ramanujan Prize
 2006 – Sloan Fellowship
 2007 – Fellow of the Royal Society
 2008 – Alan T. Waterman Award for:
"his surprising and original contributions to many fields of mathematics, including number theory, differential equations, algebra, and harmonic analysis"
 2008 – Onsager Medal for:
"his combination of mathematical depth, width and volume in a manner unprecedented in contemporary mathematics". His Lars Onsager lecture was entitled "Structure and randomness in the prime numbers" at NTNU, Norway.
 2009 – Inducted into the American Academy of Arts and Sciences
 2010 – King Faisal International Prize
 2010 – Nemmers Prize in Mathematics
 2010 – Polya Prize (with Emmanuel Candès)
 2012 – Crafoord Prize
 2012 – Simons Investigator
 2014 – Breakthrough Prize in Mathematics
"For numerous breakthrough contributions to harmonic analysis, combinatorics, partial differential equations and analytic number theory."
 2014 – Royal Medal
 2015 – PROSE award in the category of "Mathematics" for:
"Hilbert's Fifth Problem and Related Topics" 
 2019 – Riemann Prize
 2020 – Princess of Asturias Award for Technical and Scientific Research, with Emmanuel Candès, for their work on compressed sensing
 2020 – Bolyai Prize
 2021 – IEEE Jack S. Kilby Signal Processing Medal
 2021 – USIA Award
 2022 – Education & Research award finalist
 2022 - Global Australian of the Year (Advance Global Australians; Advance.org)
 2022 - Research.com Mathematics in United States Leader Award 
 2023 _ Grande Médaille
 2023 _ Research.com Mathematics in United States Leader Award

Major publications

Textbooks
 
 
 
 
 
 
 
 
 
 
 
 
 
 
 
 
Research articles. Tao is the author of over 300 articles. The following, among the most cited, are surveyed above.

See also
 Erdős discrepancy problem
 Inscribed square problem
 Goldbach's weak conjecture
 Cramer conjecture

References

External links

 Terence Tao's home page
 Tao's research blog
 Tao's MathOverflow page
 
 
 Terence Tao's entry in the Numericana Hall of Fame
 
 
 
 
 
 
 
 
 
 
 
 
 
 
 
 
  (See Collatz conjecture.)
  (See Sendov's conjecture.)
 
  (See Singmaster's conjecture.)

1975 births
20th-century American mathematicians
21st-century American mathematicians
Additive combinatorialists
American bloggers
American people of Hong Kong descent
American people of Chinese descent
Australian bloggers
Australian emigrants to the United States
Australian mathematicians
Australian people of Hong Kong descent
Australian people of Chinese descent
Clay Research Award recipients
Educators from California
Fellows of the American Academy of Arts and Sciences
Fellows of the American Mathematical Society
Fellows of the Australian Academy of Science
Fellows of the Royal Society
Fields Medalists
Flinders University alumni
Foreign associates of the National Academy of Sciences
Harmonic analysis
International Mathematical Olympiad participants
Living people
MacArthur Fellows
Mathematical analysts
Mathematicians from California
Number theorists
PDE theorists
Scientists from Adelaide
People from Los Angeles
Princeton University alumni
Recipients of the SASTRA Ramanujan Prize
Science bloggers
Simons Investigator
Sloan Research Fellows
University of California, Los Angeles faculty
Fulbright alumni